Huddington is a village in Worcestershire, England.

Location 

History & Amenities 
Huddington is associated with Huddington Court and the Worcestershire element in the Gunpowder Plot.

External links

Huddington at a Vision of Britain
Photo of Huddington Court
Genuki - very basic info on Huddington's past

Villages in Worcestershire